Daniel Meyer (born 10 September 1979) is a German football manager. He is the manager of the Under-19 squad of RB Leipzig.

References

External links

1979 births
Living people
German football managers
FC Erzgebirge Aue managers
Eintracht Braunschweig managers
2. Bundesliga managers
Sportspeople from Halle (Saale)
Footballers from Saxony-Anhalt
Association footballers not categorized by position
Association football players not categorized by nationality